Subair (25 May 1962 – 18 August 2010) was an Indian actor in Malayalam cinema industry. He was part of Malayalam films for nearly two decades and acted in around 200 films.

Personal life
Subair was born in the village of Chokli, Thalasserry in Kannur District, Kerala, India as the son of Sulaiman and Aysha. He died on 18 August 2010 due to a cardiac arrest. He has two son's Aman Subair and Ameya Subair

Career
Subair started his career in movies as a film producer at the age of 28. He produced a movie together with four of his friends, but unfortunately the movie was never released. His first movie as an actor was Bharatham in 1991 followed by the 1992 movie Manthrikacheppu.  His break came through the character Kadayadi Thambi in Lelam (1997). The Tiger, Bharathchandran I.P.S. and Pathaka are his notable works.

He has also acted in a mega tele-serial named Vamsham telecasted in DD Malayalam channel in 1994.

Selected filmography

Television
Pankiyamma (Telefilm, Doordarshan)
Vamsham (DD Malayalam)
Kadamattathu Kathanar (TV series)
Black and White (Asianet)

References

External links
 
 Subair at MSI

1962 births
2010 deaths
Male actors from Kerala
Male actors in Malayalam cinema
Indian male film actors
People from Kannur district
20th-century Indian male actors
21st-century Indian male actors